Les Hill (born 1 August 1973) is an Australian actor who has appeared in many Australian television productions including Rescue: Special Ops, Home and Away and Underbelly.

Early life
Hill was born in the Royal Hospital for Women in Randwick, New South Wales on 1 August 1973 and he has a younger sister named Rebecca.  Hill attended Prairiewood High School in Wetherill Park, New South Wales. While at school, he became "rowdy" and was eventually asked to leave.

Acting career
Hill joined the cast of Home and Away playing the role of Blake Dean; which Hill said helped him make friends in the acting business. He also acted in the film Flirting, which required him to perform his first naked frontal scene. He also played one of the main roles in Pirates Island 1991.

Hill is also known for his role as underworld figure Jason Moran in the 2008 series Underbelly. He had a starring role in the drama series Rescue: Special Ops.

Hill has also appeared in Pacific Drive as Grant Crozier in 1997, Water Rats, Wildside, the Nine Network series Scorched, and the 2010 Steven Spielberg produced Miniseries The Pacific. He also starred in Peter Benchley's The Beast alongside fellow Home and Away actor Laura Vasquez, playing one of the divers that was killed by the giant squid.

Hill reprised his role of Jason Moran in the sequel/spin-off series Fat Tony & Co. which was not a part of the Underbelly franchise due to financing reasons.  The show focused on the rise and fall of Tony Mokbel, who also featured in the original series, played by Robert Mammone.

In April 2014, it was announced that Hill has joined the cast of Wonderland as Max Saliba, a new resident with an air of mystery about him.

Film and television

Sport
Les is a self-confessed massive supporter of the Sydney Roosters rugby league team in the Australian National Rugby League.

References

External links
 

1973 births
Australian male television actors
Living people